Al-Agha Company  or Al-Agha Group is a joint stock and charitable company of Turkish origin. It was established in Egypt, affiliated to Qena Governorate, Qus, in 1995. It is one of the first companies to manufacture and export abroad and domestically. At the end of 2022, it received an international Japanese medal.

See also 

 List of companies of Egypt
 Economy of Egypt

References 

Qus
Turkish companies established in 1995
Manufacturing companies of Turkey
Manufacturing companies of Egypt